An edible seed is a seed that is suitable for human or animal consumption. Of the six major plant parts, seeds are the dominant source of human calories and protein. A wide variety of plant species provide edible seeds; most are angiosperms, while a few are gymnosperms. As a global food source, the most important edible seeds by weight are cereals, followed by legumes, nuts, then spices.

Cereals (grain crops) and legumes (pulses) correspond with the botanical families Poaceae and Fabaceae, respectively, while nuts, pseudocereals, and other seeds form polyphylic groups based on their culinary roles.

Grains (cereals and millets) 
Grains are the edible seed of a plants in the grass family Poaceae. Grains come in two varieties, the larger grains produced by drought-sensitive crops are called cereals, and the smaller drought-resistant varieties are millets. Grains can be consumed in a variety of ways, all of which require husking and cooking, including whole, rolled, puffed, or ground into flour. Many cereals are present or past staple foods, providing a large fraction of the calories in the places in which they are eaten. Today, cereals provide almost half of all calories consumed in the world.

Other grasses with edible seeds include:
Astrebla pectinata – barley Mitchell grass
 Brachiaria piligera – wattle signalgrass
 Eragrostis eriopoda – woollybutt grass
 Panicum species, such as native millet (Panicum decompositum) and hairy panic (P. effusum)
 Themeda triandra – kangaroo grass
Yakirra australiensis – bunch panic

Pseudocereals 
A pseudocereal, or pseudocereal grain, is the edible seed of a pseudocereal, one of a polyphyletic group of plants that produce seeds that resemble those of cereals. Pseudocereals are used in many of the same ways as cereals.

Legumes 

A legume, or pulse, is the edible seed of a legume, a plant in the family Fabaceae. Legumes can be divided into grams, which do not split, and dals, which split.

Although some beans can be consumed raw, some need to be heated before consumption. In certain cultures, beans that require heating are initially prepared as a seed cake. Beans that need heating include: 
 Acacia species (wattleseed), such as mulga (Acacia aneura), Halls Creek wattle (A. cowleana), southern ironwood (A. estrophiolata),  umbrella bush (A. ligulata), Murray's wattle (A. murrayana), curara (A. tetragonophylla), witchetty bush (A. kempeana), wiry wattle (A. coriacea), mallee golden wattle (A. notabilis), ranji bush (A. pyrifolia), bardi bush (A. victoriae), coastal wattle (A. sophorae), shoestring acacia (A. stenophylla), and pindan wattle (A. tumida).
 Atriplex nummularia – old man saltbush
 Brachychiton species, such as kurrajong (Brachychiton populneus), northern kurrajong (B. diversifolius),  desert kurrajong (B. gregorii), and red-flowered kurrajong (B. paradoxus).
 Bruguiera gymnorhiza – black mangrove
 Calandrinia balonensis – parakeelya
 Canarium australianum – mango bark
 Canavalia rosea – beach bean
 Entada phaseoloides – St. Thomas bean
 Eucalyptus species, such as tammin mallee (Eucalyptus leptopoda) and coolibah (E. microtheca)
 Marsilea drummondii – nardoo
Portulaca species, such as common purslane (Portulaca oleracea) and large pigweed (P. intraterranea)
Nymphaea gigantea – giant waterlily
 Rhyncharrhena linearis – purple pentatrope

Nuts 

According to the botanical definition, nuts are a particular kind of fruit. Chestnuts, hazelnuts, and acorns are examples of nuts under this definition. In culinary terms, however, the term is used more broadly to include fruits that are not botanically qualified as nuts, but that have a similar appearance and culinary role. Examples of culinary nuts include almonds and cashews.

Acorn
 Almond
 Beech
 Brazil nut
 Candlenut
 Cashew
 Chestnuts, including:
 Chinese chestnut
 Japanese chestnut
 Sweet chestnut
Chilean hazel
Egusi and other squash and melon seeds, including:
Colocynth
Malabar gourd
Pepita
Ugu
Guinea peanut
Hazelnuts, including:
 Filbert
 Hickory, including:
 Pecan
 Shagbark hickory
 Kola nut
 Macadamia
Malabar almond
 Malabar chestnut
 Mamoncillo
 Mongongo
 Ogbono
 Paradise nut
 Pili
 Pistachio
 Shea nut
 Walnuts, including:
 Black walnut

Nut-like gymnosperm seeds 

Edible gymnosperm seeds that resembles nuts include:

 Ginkgo
 Gnetum
 Juniper 
 Monkey-puzzle
 Pine nuts, including
 Pinhão
 Chilgoza pine
 Korean pine
 Mexican pinyon 
 Piñon pine
 Single-leaf pinyon
 Stone pine
 Podocarps

Other

Other edible seeds that do not neatly fit into the above categories include:

 Cempedak 
 Cocoa bean
 Coffee bean
 Cumin seed
 Durian
 Fox nut
 Hemp seed
 Jackfruit
 Lotus seed
 Mustard seed
 Osage orange seed
 Poppy seed
 Pomegranate seed
 Sunflower seed
 Pumpkin seed
 Watermelon seed

See also 

 Eastern Agricultural Complex
 List of almond dishes
 List of dried foods
 List of food origins
 List of foods
 List of legume dishes
 List of maize dishes
 List of rice dishes
 List of vegetable oils
 List of seed-based snacks
Oilseeds

Footnotes

References

Further reading
 
 

+
seeds, edible
seeds, edible

'
seeds, edible